Male Vesele (until 2016 Radhospne (Радгоспне)) is a rural settlement (posyolok) in Kharkiv Raion (district) in Kharkiv Oblast of eastern Ukraine, at about  north-east from the centre of Kharkiv city.

The settlement came under attack by Russian forces during the Russian invasion of Ukraine in 2022.

References

Villages in Kharkiv Raion